The Mirror & The Light is a historical novel by the English writer Hilary Mantel. Following Wolf Hall (2009) and Bring Up the Bodies (2012), it is the final instalment in her trilogy charting the rise and fall of Thomas Cromwell, minister in the court of King Henry VIII, covering the last four years of his life, from 1536 until his death by execution in 1540.

Mantel's twelfth novel, her first in almost eight years, The Mirror  & The Light was published in March 2020 to widespread critical acclaim, and enjoyed brisk sales. In December 2020, Emily Temple of Literary Hub reported that the novel had made 13 lists of the best books of 2020. It won the 2021 Walter Scott Prize for historical fiction. It is the final novel published in Mantel's lifetime.

Plot
The Mirror & The Light covers the period following the death of Anne Boleyn in 1536. It describes Cromwell's ascent to the pinnacle of his riches and power, followed by his fall from royal favour and his public execution at Tower Hill in 1540.

Publication
Though Mantel had originally hoped to publish the book in 2018, it did not appear until March 2020. Mantel dismissed speculation the novel had been delayed due to writer's block, distractions caused by stage and screen adaptations of her previous novels, or because she couldn't bring herself to write Cromwell's execution scene. Saying the project had simply been difficult, Mantel added, "But that’s not an explanation that has any news value, so people are looking for a dramatic story of the whole process breaking down."

When it was published in the UK on 5 March 2020, bookstores opened at midnight to sell the title. Initial UK sales were brisk, with over 95,000 copies sold in the first three days. Henry Holt and Company published the US edition five days later, on 10 March 2020.

Reception 
The Mirror & the Light received mostly laudatory reviews from critics. The New York Times called it "the triumphant capstone to Mantel’s trilogy," the Financial Times called it "majestic and often breathtakingly poetic," and the Washington Post called it a "masterful finale." The Times Literary Supplement called it "some of the most complex and immersive fiction to have come along in years," while the Guardian hailed it as a "masterpiece" and called Mantel's Cromwell trilogy "the greatest English novels of this century." The Los Angeles Times called Mantel "unique among modern novelists in her ability to make the past as viscerally compelling as the present," USA Today said that "every page is rich with insight," and the Wall Street Journal called her Cromwell trilogy "a brilliant engagement with the exercise and metaphysics of power in 16th-century Europe." However, the New Yorker criticised its length (754 pages in the US edition), calling it "a bloated and only occasionally captivating work."

The Mirror & the Light was shortlisted for the 2020 Women's Prize for Fiction.

Stage adaptation
Like the preceding volumes, The Mirror and the Light has been adapted for the stage, produced by the Royal Shakespeare Company with a script written by Mantel and Ben Miles. The play has opened at the Gielgud Theatre, London in September 2021.

References

External links
Hilary Mantel's Website
Hilary Mantel's Facebook Fan Page
When will the next Wolf Hall book be published?

Fiction set in the 1530s
British historical novels
2020 British novels
Fourth Estate books
Novels by Hilary Mantel
Novels set in Tudor England
Henry Holt and Company books
Cultural depictions of Henry VIII
Cultural depictions of Anne Boleyn
Walter Scott Prize-winning works